Richard George Suter (1827–1894) was an architect in Queensland, Australia. Many of his buildings are now heritage-listed.

Early life

Richard George Suter trained as an architect in London under his father after completing a Bachelor of Arts at Trinity College Cambridge in 1850.

Architecture career

By 1865 Suter was working for Brisbane's leading architect Benjamin Backhouse while establishing his own practice. Suter was one of Queensland's most prolific and prominent architects of the late 19th century and was responsible for such grand designs as Jimbour House (Suter & Voysey 1873), St Mark's Anglican Church, Warwick (1867–70) and is recognised for his influence on the standard designs of schools in Queensland with the Board of Education using his designs almost exclusively until 1875.

Later life
After a decline in his success, Suter moved to Melbourne in 1876 and became a priest for the Catholic Apostolic Church. He died on 27 July 1894 at 114 Drummond Street, Carlton of heart disease.

Significant works
 1867-1870: St Mark's Anglican Church, Warwick 
 1868-1869: St James Church of England, Toowoomba
 1871: St Augustines Anglican Church, Leyburn

References

Attribution 

Articles incorporating text from the Queensland Heritage Register
Architects from Brisbane

Irvingites
1827 births
1894 deaths
English emigrants to Australia
Alumni of Trinity College, Cambridge
Clergy from Melbourne